There were a number of medieval rabbinic scholars and biblical exegetes named Ephraim:

 Ephraim ben Isaac of Regensburg, a 12th-century German tosafist 
 Ephraim ben Jacob HaKohen, a 17th-century Lithuanian talmudist
 Ephraim ben Joseph of Chelm, a 16th-century Polish liturgist
 Ephraim ben Judah, a 12th-century French liturgist
 Ephraim ben Nathan, a 13th-century German talmudist
 Ephraim ben Samson, a 12th-century French tosafist
 Ephraim of Bonn, a 12th-century German talmudist
 Ephraim of Sudilkov, an 18th-century Polish author and member of the Baal Shem Tov's rabbinic dynasty